The renewable energy policy of Bangladesh is a set of policies and programs set by the Government of Bangladesh to reach national goals in the field of renewable energy in the country. The Renewable Energy Policy of Bangladesh was released in 2008 by the Ministry of Power, Energy, and Mineral Resources. Bangladesh currently has a target of meeting 10% of power demand from renewable energy resources by 2020, although current generation of renewable energy is less than 1% of total electricity generation. 

Various government regimes have drafted such policies to supplement the electricity sector in Bangladesh. The country faces mismanaged distribution and supply of electricity, which is why it faces up to 2000 megawatts of electricity shortage. This has forced hundreds of manufacturing firms across the country to shut down taking a toll on the national GDP.

See also

Renewable energy in Bangladesh
Renewable energy policy
Renewable energy commercialization

References

External links
Renewable Energy Policy. 2002 Draft at Government of Bangladesh: MINISTRY OF ENERGY AND MINERAL RESOURCES

Renewable energy policy
Policy